The following highways are numbered 702:

Costa Rica
 National Route 702

United States